Best of England Dan & John Ford Coley is a greatest hits album by the pop rock duo England Dan & John Ford Coley, released in 1979.

Track listing
"I'd Really Love to See You Tonight" (Parker McGee)
"Nights Are Forever Without You" (McGee)
"Soldier in the Rain" (John Ford Coley, Sunny Dalton)
"It's Sad to Belong" (Randy Goodrum)
"What Can I Do with This Broken Heart" (Coley, Dan Seals, Bob Gundry)
"In It for Love" (Dennis Henson, Greg Guidry)
"Love Is the Answer" (Todd Rundgren)
"Falling Stars" (Coley)
"We'll Never Have to Say Goodbye Again" (Jeffrey Comanor)
"Gone Too Far" (Coley)
"Who's Lonely Now" (Seals, Coley)
"Why Is It Me" (Seals)

1979 greatest hits albums
England Dan & John Ford Coley albums
Big Tree Records albums